David Baldwin  ( 22 December 1946 (?) – 4 April 2016) was a British historian, author and former university lecturer, who lived near Leicester, England.

Baldwin specialised in late Medieval history—"the great medieval families of the Midlands"—and wrote several books about the people and events of the Wars of the Roses. Before retiring from teaching, Baldwin had previously worked as a lecturer at both the University of Leicester and the University of Nottingham. In 1986, over 25 years before the 2012 excavation and the discovery of the king's body, he predicted that Richard III's remains would be found at Greyfriars, Leicester.

In his 2010 book, Robin Hood: The English Outlaw Unmasked, Baldwin argued  that the 'real' Robin Hood was Roger Godberd, a disinherited supporter of Simon de Montfort. He drew attention to the many similarities between Godberd's career and the stories told of Robin in the earliest ballads, and to a grave slab in Loxley churchyard in Warwickshire which appeared to be identical to one associated with Robin in earlier centuries.

In his 2007 book, The Lost Prince: The Survival of Richard of York, Baldwin discussed the possibility that the younger of the Princes in the Tower, Prince Richard, survived, and was the "Richard Plantagenet" who died in December 1550 at Eastwell in Kent. Richard had worked as a bricklayer at St. John's Abbey, Colchester, until 1539, but, unusually for someone of his class, could read Latin. He is sometimes said to have been an illegitimate son of King Richard III.

Baldwin was elected a Fellow of the Royal Historical Society in 2012.

A religious man, Baldwin was a member of a Christadelphian congregation in Leicester.

Works
Baldwin was the author of several books and contributed to a number of historical journals. In addition to teaching at Leicester and Nottingham Universities, he professionally lectured for societies and conferences.

"King Richard's Grave in Leicester", Transactions of the Leicester Archaeological and Historical Society; Volume 60, (1986)
Elizabeth Woodville, The History Press: 2004 – 
The Kingmaker's Sisters: Six Powerful Women in the Wars of the Roses, The History Press: 2006 – 
Stoke Field: The Last Battle of the Wars of the Roses, Pen and Sword Books: 2006 – 
The Lost Prince: The Survival of Richard of York, The History Press: 2007 – 
Robin Hood: The English Outlaw Unmasked, Amberley Publishing: 2010 – 
Richard III, Amberley Publishing: 2012 – 
The Women of the Cousins' War: The Duchess, the Queen and the King's Mother, with Philippa Gregory and Michael Jones, Simon & Schuster:2012 – 
The White Queen – What happened to the Princes in the Tower?, BBC History, 9 August 2013.
 Richard III. The Leicester Connection. Pitkin 2013. . New edition 2015, .
 Henry VIII's Last Love. The Extraordinary Life of Katherine Willoughby. Amberley Publidhing 2015. .

References

External links
Author Page at Amazon.com
Profile at Good Reads
Article in the Leicester Mercury, which includes photograph

British medievalists
British writers
Christadelphians
English Christians
Academics of the University of Nottingham
Academics of the University of Leicester
Fellows of the Royal Historical Society
1946 births
2016 deaths